7500 series may refer to:

 Chichibu Railway 7500 series, a Japanese train type
 Hokuso 7500 series, a Japanese train type
 ICL 7500 series, a range of terminals and workstations developed by ICL